Alta is a ski area in the western United States, located in the town of Alta in the Wasatch Mountains of Utah, in Salt Lake County. One of the oldest ski resorts in the country, it opened its first lift in early 1939. Alta is one of three remaining ski resorts in the U.S. that prohibits snowboarders, along with nearby competitor Deer Valley and Vermont's Mad River Glen.

History

Early History
Alta is one of the oldest ski areas in the U.S. and is one of just three ski areas in the U.S. that prohibits snowboarders.

Alta Ski Area features long, straight, fall-line pitches. Among the most well known and most favored are Alf's High Rustler, Eddie's High Nowhere, Stone Crusher and the Baldy Chutes. Though widely respected as one of the most challenging of in-bounds ski areas in the world, Alta has always viewed itself as a local's and family oriented ski area.

The community of Alta was established in 1871 as an offshoot of the silver mining operations in Little Cottonwood Canyon. A fire destroyed most of the town in 1878, then a cataclysmic avalanche in 1885—combined with the decline of mining—heralded a period of dormancy for the town. The area experienced a modest resurgence in mining in the 1900s, but the town declined again shortly thereafter, and was deserted with the exception of a few hardy miners who continued to intermittently prospect the area.

In 1935 the U.S. Forest Service retained the noted skier Alf Engen to hike into the area and determine its potential as a future ski area. Engen's reports expressed great promise for the area, and recommended the purchase of additional surrounding lands to form the ski area. In 1937 a prominent Salt Lake City lawyer, Joe Quinney, along with other local businessmen, formed the Utah Winter Sports Association to oversee the development of skiing at Alta. In the following year construction began on the original Collins chairlift, fashioned from a surplus mining ore tramway system that featured a clamp-cam bullwheel gripping a metal cable strung with single-seat chairs. It was the second such chairlift in the United States, after Sun Valley. Alta opened to skiers for the first time in 1939 on January 15, offering a single ride on the chair for 25 cents.

Recent Developments
Alta installed its first triple in 1991, by upgrading the Germania double chair. The resort began adding a developed snowmaking infrastructure in 1996, and the ski area continues to develop and refine the process. The late 1990s and early 2000s were marked with further modernization. In 1999 the Sunnyside lift was replaced with a detachable triple chair, the resort's first detachable chairlift. Two years later the Supreme chair was upgraded to a triple, and the Sugarloaf chair was replaced with a detachable quad. In the summer of 2004, the Collins double lift and Germania triple lifts were replaced with a single two-stage detachable quad going from the base of the former Collins lift to the top terminal of the former Germania lift. During the 2007–08 season, Alta introduced a new Axess RFID electronic lift ticket system, similar to that of the Solitude Ski Resort. During the 2008–09 season, Alta added a conveyor system at the start point of the Supreme lift that assists skiers in loading. Alta added safety bars to Sunnyside in 2010 and to Collins, Sugarloaf, and Supreme in the summer of 2011. For the 2017–18 season, Leitner-Poma built a high speed quad that replaced the former Supreme and Cecret lifts, extending from the Sugarloaf base area to the top terminal of the former Supreme lift. For the 2022-23 season, Leitner-Poma constructed a high speed six pack to replace the Sunnyside and Albion lifts.

Future Developments 
The ski area is in the process of planning for the next several years. Many of the decisions will be made as the Mountain Accord process evolves. This involves a tram to the top of Mt. Baldy, a lift from the Sugar Bowl to Sugarloaf Pass, and improvements to parking.

As of 2022, the resort has one high speed six pack, three high speed quads, one fixed grip quad, one triple chairlift, one double chairlift, and five surface tows. The terrain is classified as 15% Beginner, 30% Intermediate, and 55% Advanced.

On January 15, 2014, a group called Wasatch Equality and four individual snowboarders filed a lawsuit in the United States District Court for the District of Utah against Alta Ski Area and the United States Forest Service, seeking to permanently disallow Alta from enforcing its anti-snowboarder policy and snowboarding ban. Alta Ski Area prevailed in the ruling and continues to exclusively serve skiers.

The Ski Area 
The ski area is owned by multiple individuals, with the largest shares being held by the Laughlin family (51%), the Quinney family (25%), and the Bass family (11%). The hotels at the base are all independently owned and not a part of Alta.

Partnership with Snowbird 
Beginning in the winter of 2002, Alta and its neighbor, Snowbird, began offering a joint day pass and a joint season ticket, allowing skiers to fully access all of the terrain of both resorts. The offer coincided with the opening of a new lift in Mineral Basin, a large bowl owned by Snowbird on the back of Snowbird's Hidden Peak and Alta's Sugarloaf mountains, that allowed access to Alta from the Basin. Other access points between the two resorts exist as well. (The offer is open to skiers only, as a result of Alta's skiers-only policy; Snowbird allows snowboarders.)

Lifts
Alta currently has eight lifts. Three are located in Albion Basin, two are located in Collins Gulch, one transfers skiers between the two base areas, and the remaining two access hotels.

Terrain aspects
 North: 53%
 East: 17%
 West: 29%
 South: 1%
Source:

References

 Shrontz, Duane (1989) Alta: a people's story Alta Ski Lifts Corp 
 Asmus, Brad (1993) Powder Hound's Guide to Skiing Alta 
 Engen, Alan (1998) For the Love of Skiing: A Visual History

External links

AltaCam – Alta Skiing Info est. 1996
Alta Skiing Guide Book – The Powder Hound's Guide to Skiing Alta, a 160-page guide book that describes each of the important runs on one of the most challenging mountains in alpine skiing.
Ski Lifts.org – Alta – current and removed lifts
 Live Webcams

Sports venues in Salt Lake County, Utah
Ski areas and resorts in Utah
Utah culture
Event venues established in 1939
Wasatch Range
1939 establishments in Utah